Anoushka or variants Anuschka, Annushka or Anushka may refer to:

People
 Anoushka (Egyptian singer) (born 1960), stage name of Egyptian singer Wartanoush Garbis Selim
 Anoushka (given name), people carrying the name and all its variants

Entertainment
 Anoushka (album), the 1998 debut album of Anoushka Shankar
 Annushka (film), 1959 Soviet drama film directed by Boris Barnet
 Anuschka (film), a 1942 German film by Helmut Käutner
 Anoushka, a character in The Master and Margarita

Others
Annushka (airline), Russian agricultural air company based in Shamakova, Russia
 Antonov An-2 transport aircraft (nicknamed Annushka)